Ockhuizen is a hamlet near the village of Haarzuilens in the Dutch province of Utrecht. It is a part of the municipality of Utrecht, and lies about 11 km northwest from the city centre of Utrecht.

The hamlet has about 10 farmhouses and other dwellings.

References

External link

Populated places in Utrecht (province)